In Māori mythology, Ohomairangi is an important ancestor who lived in Hawaiki six generations before the migration to Aotearoa (New Zealand). He is considered the major ancestor of the people of both Te Arawa and Tainui waka. During his lifetime, Ohomairangi acted as the guardian of Taputapuatea marae in Rangiatea (Raiatea), which is considered the most sacred site in Polynesia. 

Said to be the son of Kuraimonoa, a mortal woman, and the celestial being Pūhaorangi, Ohomairangi was the father of the high priest and navigator, Muturangi, who contended with Kupe.

By the time of his great-grandson Atuamatua, the descendants of Ohomairangi were known as Ngāti Ohomairangi or Nga Ohomairangi and had influence at Aitutaki, Raiatea, and surrounding islands. Eventually two divisions of this tribe were responsible for the construction of the Te Arawa Waka and Tainui Waka, respectively, which participated in the migration to New Zealand.

Among his descendants is Tama-te-kapua, who would discover New Zealand in around 1350.

References

Māori mythology
Legendary Polynesian people